Ezra FC is a football club from Vientiane, Laos. It currently plays in the Lao League 1, the highest division of Laotian football.

Players

References

External links
 Weltfussballarchiv 

Football clubs in Laos